Zhang Zeduan (1085–1145), courtesy name Zhengdao, was a Chinese painter of the Song dynasty. He lived during the transitional period from the Northern Song to the Southern Song, and was instrumental in the early history of the Chinese landscape art style known as shan shui. He is known for painting Along the River During the Qingming Festival.

See also
Chinese art
Chinese painting
Shan shui
Lin Tinggui
Zhou Jichang
Culture of the Song Dynasty

Notes

References
Needham, Joseph (1971). Science and Civilisation in China: Volume 4, Physics and Physical Technology, Part 3, Civil Engineering and Nautics. Cambridge: Cambridge University Press.

External links

 Zhang Zeduan and his Painting Gallery at China Online Museum
 Landscapes Clear and Radiant: The Art of Wang Hui (1632–1717), an exhibition catalog from The Metropolitan Museum of Art (fully available online as PDF), which contains material on Zhang Zeduan (see index)

1085 births
1145 deaths
12th-century Chinese painters
Court painters
Painters from Shandong
People from Weifang
Song dynasty landscape painters